Walter I de Claville (floruit 1086) (alias de Clarville and Latinised to de Clavilla) was an Anglo-Norman magnate and one of the 52 Devon Domesday Book tenants-in-chief of King William the Conqueror. He also held lands in Dorset. His Devonshire estates later formed part of the feudal barony of Gloucester.

Origins
He is believed to have originated at any one of the manors called Claville or Clasville in the Duchy of Normandy, namely:
Claville near Évreux
Claville-Motteville near Yvetot
Clasville near Cany Barville
His brother was Gotshelm, also a Devonshire tenant-in-chief, whose estates also later formed part of the feudal barony of Gloucester.

Progeny
It is not known whether he married and left progeny, however Walter II de Claville (supposed by Cleveland to be his grandson) in about 1170 gave many of Walter I's former  Domesday Book estates to a priory which he established on his estate of Leigh within his manor of Burlescombe, later known as Canons' Leigh Priory. Furthermore,  several of his estates were held in the 13th century by a certain "William de Claville", as recorded in the Book of Fees (see list below).

Succession

Sir William Pole (d.1635) gives the descent of the manor of Lomen Clavill, in the parish of Uplowman, as follows:
Walter I de Claville, Domesday Book tenant
William I de Claville
Sir Walter II de Claville
William II de Claville
Sir Walter III de Claville
Sir William III de Claville
Sir Roger I de Claville, who according to Risdon died sans issue and was succeeded by his nephew William Clavell.
John I de Claville (brother), heir of Roger I according to Pole. Apparently the John Clavell who according to Risdon was the grandson of William and died in the reign of King Edward III (1327-1377), having been "slain the next day after his marriage, coming from London to these parts, but his wife was conceived with child and brought a son, who had this (Lomen Clavell) and other his father's inheritance". Risdon however gives his son and heir as William.
John II de Claville (son), according to Pole.
John III de Claville
William IV de Claville (son)
William V de Claville (son), died without progeny

According to Sir William Pole (d.1635), the male line of the Clavell family was extinguished during the reign of King Richard II (1377-1399). The heir to Lomen Clavell was the Beare family, lords of the nearby manor of Huntsham. There was however at some time a dispute over the inheritance between Thomas Beare and Sir Henry Perchey (alias Percehay). The hamlets of Lomen Clavell and Bukinton Clavell still retained the family's name in the 19th century. According to Pole the arms of "Clavill of Burlescombe" were: Or, three keys gules which are thus canting arms alluding to the Latin clavis, meaning a "key".

In Dorsetshire however the family continued longer than the Devonshire branch and according to Hutchins (d.1773) the Dorsetshire historian: "the family of Clavell could boast an antiquity not to be equalled in this county and very rarely in any other", and was carried on in the male line until the latter half of the 17th century.

Landholdings in Devon
The manors or fees held by Walter I de Claville were recorded as 32 separate entries in the following order in the Domesday Book (with modern-day spellings):

Landholdings in Dorset
In Dorset he held five manors including East Morden, since known as Morden-Maltravers. According to Hutchins four of the manors held by Walter de Claville in Domesday "seem to have passed at a very early period to a younger son—perhaps before the time of Henry II. Robert de Clavile held a fee in 'Porbica' in the time of Henry I., of which two hides were given to the Abbot of Tewkesbury, probably about 1106, soon after the Monastery of Cranborne became a priory dependent upon the former house. The gift was conferred by charter of King Henry I. In 12 Hen. II., (i.e. 1166 Cartae Baronum) Radulphus de Clavill held one fee in Dorset of Alured de Lincoln, of the "new feoffment", and Robert de Clavile held another of Gerbert de Perci, of the "old feoffment". Tewkesbury Abbey was founded by the Earl of Gloucester and thus is a link to the Honour of Gloucester to which Walter I's Devonshire holdings passed. The arms of the Clavell family of Dorset were: Argent, on a chevron sable three chapeaux or.

References

Sources
Thorn, Caroline & Frank, (eds.) Domesday Book, (Morris, John, gen. ed.) Vol. 9, Devon, Parts 1 & 2, Phillimore Press, Chichester, 1985, part 2 (notes), chapter 24
Cleveland, Duchess of (Catherine Powlett), The Battle Abbey Roll with some Account of the Norman Lineages, 3 vols., London, 1889, Vol. III, "Clarvaile"
Hutchins, John (d. 1773), History and Antiquities of the County of Dorset, 1774

Devon Domesday Book tenants-in-chief